Kay Kāvus; sometimes Kai-Káús or Kai-Kaus, is a mythological shah of Greater Iran and a character in the Shāhnāmeh. He is the son of Kay Qobād and the father of prince Seyāvash. Kāvus rules Iran for one hundred and fifty years during which he is frequently though increasingly grudgingly aided by the famous hero Rostam. He is succeeded by his grandson Kay Khosrow.

The flying throne
The Flying Throne of Kay Kāvus was a legendary eagle-propelled craft built by Kay Kāvus, used for flying the king all the way to China.

According to the Shāhnāmeh, Kāvus had a flying craft made consisting of a throne to the corners of which were attached four long poles pointing upward. It was made of wood and gold and he attached specially trained eagles. Pieces of meat were attached at the top of each pole and the ravenous eagles were chained to the feet. As the eagles tried to reach the meat they caused the throne to fly. The craft flew the king all the way to China, where the eagles grew tired and the craft came down. Rostam eventually had to rescue the king who, miraculously, survived the crash.

See also
Perses (son of Andromeda and Perseus)

References

External links 

 Unmuseum on the Flying Throne of Kay Kāvus

Kayanians
Longevity myths
Persian mythology
Shahnameh characters
Mythological kings
Legendary flying machines